Baba Sorkheh (also Romanized as Bābā Sorkheh; also known as Bāba Sūrkh and Bāba Sūrkheh) is a village in Howmeh Rural District, in the Central District of Bijar County, Kurdistan Province, Iran. At the 2006 census, its population was 102, in 25 families. The village is populated by Kurds.

References 

Towns and villages in Bijar County
Kurdish settlements in Kurdistan Province